William Edward Hayter Preston (1891–1964) was a British literary editor, journalist, poet and author of several books.

W. E. Hayter Preston was from adolescence interested in freethought, socialism and the occult. In 1906 he became a friend of Victor Benjamin Neuburg, who introduced him to Aleister Crowley. In 1912 Preston joined Crowley's group Mysteria Mystica Maxima but left the group in 1914 following an argument with Crowley. Starting in 1925, Preston wrote a column for The Sunday Referee under the pseudonym "Vanoc II" — the columnist "Vanoc I" was Arnold White (who died in February 1925). Preston became the literary editor for The Sunday Referee. In April 1940 he was one of the founders of the Surrealist Group in London.

Books

 (with illustrations by Frank Brangwyn; 12 editions from 1923 to 1975)
with Henry Savage: 
with Henry Savage: 
with Henry Savage:

References

1891 births
1964 deaths
20th-century British journalists